Kendricke Bullard (born April 30, 1972) is a former American football wide receiver. He played for the Jacksonville Jaguars in 1996.

References

1972 births
Living people
American football wide receivers
Arkansas State Red Wolves football players
New England Patriots players
Jacksonville Jaguars players